Anticore (2006) is the seventh album by Acumen Nation.

Track listing 
 "Bliss" - 3:14
 "The Blind Pig" - 3:12
 "Day Care" - 3:34
 "Black Son Hole" - 4:21
 "My Life's Last Breath" - 3:42
 "Tools in the Blood Shed" - 6:34
 "Branch Davidian Style" - 2:54
 "Caustic Perimeter" - 5:21
 "No Arms No Legs" - 4:01
 "Jesus Loves You" - 4:11
 "P.O.D.O.A." - 3:23
 "Haliburton Rape Trail" - 3:37
 "Destroyasaurus" - 5:44
 "Polhemic" - 7:00
 "Message From the Grave" - 5:00

All music and lyrics written by Jason Novak, except...
 "Bliss" co-written by Dan Brill
 "The Blind Pig" music by Acumen Nation
 "P.O.D.O.A." music by Jamie Duffy

Personnel 
 Jason Novak – vocals, guitars, electronics
 Eliot Engelman – bass guitar
 Dan Brill – drums
 Jamie Duffy – guitars, electronics
 Brian Elza - guest guitars on "The Blind Pig" and "Black Son Hole"
 Lucia Cifarelli - guest vocals on "My Life's Last Breath"

References 

2006 albums
Acumen Nation albums